Gurwinder Singh Chandi (born 20 October 1989 in Jalandhar, India) in an Indian professional field hockey player.

Career
Gurwinder Singh Chandi made his debut for the national side in the 4-Nations Cup in Australia in the year 2008. He represented India in Men's Hockey during the 2012 London Olympics.  He won a silver medal with India at the 2014 Commonwealth Games.

Hockey India League
In the inaugural Hockey India League auctions, Gurwinder Singh Chandi was bought by the Delhi franchise for US$50,000, with his base price being US$13,900.

References

External links 
 

1989 births
Living people
Field hockey players at the 2012 Summer Olympics
Olympic field hockey players of India
Field hockey players from Jalandhar
Field hockey players at the 2010 Commonwealth Games
Field hockey players at the 2014 Commonwealth Games
Asian Games medalists in field hockey
Field hockey players at the 2014 Asian Games
Indian male field hockey players
Commonwealth Games silver medallists for India
Commonwealth Games medallists in field hockey
Asian Games gold medalists for India
Medalists at the 2014 Asian Games
Hockey India League players
Delhi Waveriders players
2010 Men's Hockey World Cup players
Medallists at the 2010 Commonwealth Games
Medallists at the 2014 Commonwealth Games